Mamady Condé is a Guinean politician and diplomat. Condé was first appointed to the post of Minister of Foreign Affairs in March 2004. Being replaced by Fatoumata Kaba on March 8, 2005, Condé was appointed once again as foreign minister in 2006, retaining the post until March 2007.

References

Year of birth missing (living people)
Living people
Guinean diplomats
Government ministers of Guinea
Ambassadors of Guinea to the United States